Sveti Jernej may refer to several places in Slovenia: 

Seča, a settlement in the Municipality of Piran (known as Sveti Jernej until 1958)
Sveti Jernej, Slovenske Konjice, a settlement in the Municipality of Slovenske Konjice
Sveti Jernej nad Muto, a settlement in the Municipality of Muta
Sveti Jernej pri Ločah, the name of Sveti Jernej in the Municipality of Slovenske Konjice until 1955